The men's team sabre was one of seven fencing events on the Fencing at the 1928 Summer Olympics programme. It was the fifth appearance of the event. The competition was held from 8 August 1928 to 9 August 1928. 65 fencers from 12 nations competed.

Rosters

Belgium
 Joseph Stordeur
 Marcel Cuypers
 Jacques Kesteloot
 Édouard Yves
 Gaston Kaanen

Chile
 Jorge Garretón
 Abelardo Castro
 Tomás Goyoaga
 Oscar Novoa
 Efrain Díaz
 Nemoroso Riquelme

France
 Raoul Fristeau
 Roger Ducret
 Jean Lacroix
 Maurice Taillandier
 Jean Piot
 Paul Oziol de Pignol

Germany
 Erwin Casmir
 Heinrich Moos
 Hans Halberstadt
 Hans Thomson

Great Britain
 Edward Brookfield
 Archie Corble
 Alex Forrest
 Guy Harry
 Robin Jeffreys
 Barry Notley

Greece
 Konstantinos Botasis
 Georgios Ambet
 Tryfon Triantafyllakos
 Konstantinos Nikolopoulos

Hungary
 Ödön von Tersztyánszky
 János Garay
 Attila Petschauer
 József Rády
 Sándor Gombos
 Gyula Glykais

Italy
 Bino Bini
 Oreste Puliti
 Giulio Sarrocchi
 Renato Anselmi
 Emilio Salafia
 Gustavo Marzi

Netherlands
 Cornelis Ekkart
 Hendrik Hagens
 Maarten van Dulm
 Jan van der Wiel
 Arie de Jong
 Henri Wijnoldy-Daniëls

Poland
 Adam Papée
 Tadeusz Friedrich
 Kazimierz Laskowski
 Władysław Segda
 Aleksander Małecki
 Jerzy Zabielski

Turkey
 Muhuttin Okyavuz
 Fuat Balkan
 Nami Yayak
 Enver Balkan

United States
 Ervin Acel
 Norman Cohn-Armitage
 John Huffman
 Arthur Lyon
 Nickolas Muray
 Harold Van Buskirk

Results
Source: Official results; De Wael

Round 1

Each pool was a round-robin (with matches not being held where unnecessary to the overall result).  Bouts were to five touches, and each fencer from one nation had a bout against each from the opponent.  The nation which won the most individual bouts took the team bout (with total touches as the tie-breaker if the teams split 8-8).  The top two nations in each pool advanced to the semifinals.

Semifinals

Each pool was a round-robin (with matches not being held where unnecessary to the overall result).  Bouts were to five touches, and each fencer from one nation had a bout against each from the opponent.  The nation which won the most individual bouts took the team bout (with total touches as the tie-breaker if the teams split 8-8).  The top two nations in each pool advanced to the final.

Final

The final was a round-robin.  Bouts were to five touches, and each fencer from one nation had a bout against each from the opponent.  The nation which won the most individual bouts took the team bout (with total touches as the tie-breaker if the teams split 8-8).

Hungary beat both Italy and Poland, which had each beaten Germany; therefore, the Hungary-Germany match was unnecessary as Hungary would win gold and Germany take fourth regardless of the results.  The reason for not holding the Italy-Poland match is less clear; the official report says it was not necessary, but presumably the winner would be the silver medalist while the loser would take the bronze.  Italy had defeated Poland 16-0 in the semifinals, which may have been how the final placing was decided.

References

Fencing at the 1928 Summer Olympics
Men's events at the 1928 Summer Olympics